Cruel to Be Young is indie band Jonezetta's second full-length album, which was released on September 16, 2008 through Tooth & Nail Records.

Track listing
 "Wide Awake"
 "Holding Onto You"
 "Busy Body"
 "Paint & Picture"
 "Sick In the Teeth"
 "Cruel to Be Young"
 "Fur Coat (Roaming Like Animals)"
 "Valentine"
 "Untitled"
 "The Queen City Song"
 "I Watched You, Out From Your Window"

References

External links
Jonezetta's official Myspace page
Jonezetta on JesusfreakHideout

2008 albums
Jonezetta albums
Tooth & Nail Records albums